Marios Garoyian (born 31 May 1961) is a Greek Cypriot politician. He served as leader of the Democratic Party from 2006 to 2013. On 6 March 2008, he was elected President of the House of Representatives of Cyprus, thereby holding the highest elected post currently held by an Armenian outside of Armenia.

Early life

Garoyian was born in Nicosia. He studied political science at the University of Perugia. He has one son and one daughter. He speaks Greek, English, Italian and Spanish fluently. He is of half Armenian and half Latin descent.

After the election of Dimitris Christofias as President of the Republic of Cyprus on 24 February 2008, the position of the President of the House of Representatives remained vacant until Garoyian's election to the post on 6 March 2008 by the members of the House.

Parliamentary activities

At the parliamentary elections of 21 May 2006, he was elected Member of the House of Representatives standing as a DIKO candidate in Nicosia. He was elected President of the House of Representatives for the remainder of the Ninth Term of Office of the House.

He is a member of the Committee of Selection, of the House Standing Committee on the Environment and of the House Standing Committee on Foreign Affairs and an alternate member of the Special House Committee on Declaration and Examination of Financial Interests.

He is an alternate member of the delegation of the House to the Euro-Mediterranean Parliamentary Assembly.

Political and social activities

He was president of the “Anagennisi” student union in Italy (1981) and of the National Student Union of Cypriots in Perugia (1983) and a member of the Executive Committee of the Pancyprian Student and Young Scientists Federation.

He was also president of the District Committee of the Youth Organisation of DIKO (NEDIK) in Nicosia and secretary of Unionism of the Labour Department of the party.

He was director of the President’s Office of the House of Representatives from 1991 to 2001, during the presidency terms of Alexis Galanos and the late Spyros Kyprianou. He was director of the Press Office of the President of the Republic Tassos Papadopoulos and Deputy Government Spokesman from 2003 to 2006.

He has been a member of the Central Committee of DIKO since 1988 and a member of the Executive Bureau of the party since 1997. On 22 October 2006 he was elected president of DIKO, a position he held until 2 December 2013.

Publications

He has published a series of articles on the Cyprus problem and the European Union, as well as on various topics of wider public interest in the Cyprus and foreign press. As an international and a political analyst he appears regularly in Cypriot and Greek media.

Honorary awards
The Hellenic Republic has awarded him the cross of the Grand Commander of the Order of Honour.

References

 

|-

1961 births
Cypriot people of Armenian descent
Democratic Party (Cyprus) politicians
Grand Commanders of the Order of Honour (Greece)
Leaders of political parties in Cyprus
Living people
People from Nicosia
Presidents of the House of Representatives (Cyprus)
University of Perugia alumni
Ethnic Armenian politicians
Cypriot expatriates in Italy